Christoph Jank (born 14 October 1973 in Zwettl) is an Austrian football player and manager.

External links

1973 births
Living people
Austrian footballers
Austria international footballers
FC Red Bull Salzburg players
First Vienna FC players
SK Vorwärts Steyr players
SV Ried players
Wiener Sport-Club managers
Association football defenders
Austrian football managers
People from Zwettl
Footballers from Lower Austria